Kevon is a given name of Irish origin. Notable people with the name include:

Kevon Boodie (born 1993), Guyanese cricketer
Kevon Carter (1983–2014), Trinidadian soccer player
Kevon Clement (born 1983), Trinidadian football player
Kevon Cooper (born 1989), Trinidadian cricket player
Kevon Edmonds (born 1958), American singer and actor
Kevon Fubler (born 1992), Bermudian cricketer
Kevon Glickman (born 1960), American music producer and entertainment lawyer
Kevon Harris (footballer) (born 1981), Jamaican footballer
Kevon Looney (born 1996), American basketball player
Kevon Neaves (born 1985), Trinidadian soccer player
Kevon Pierre  (born 1982), Trinidadian sprinter
Kevon Smith (born 1955), American musician, singer-songwriter, and record producer
Kevon Villaroel (born 1987), Trinidadian football player

See also

Kevin
Kevan
Kevyn

References